White Flag may refer to:
White flag, a white-colored flag used in various contexts, especially war

Music

Bands
 White Flag (band), an American punk rock band 
 Whiteflag Project, formerly known as Whiteflag, world fusion band from Israel and Gaza Strip
 Passion: White Flag, an album by the Passion Worship Band

Songs
 "White Flag" (Dido song)
 "White Flag" (Passion song)
 "White Flag", a song by Clairo from Immunity
 "White Flag", a song by Bishop Briggs from Church of Scars
 "White Flag", a song by Sabrina Carpenter from Can't Blame a Girl for Trying and Eyes Wide Open
 "White Flag", a song by Far East Movement from Free Wired
 "White Flag", a song by Gorillaz from Plastic Beach
 "White Flag", a song by Guided by Voices from The Bears for Lunch
 "White Flag", a song by Joseph from I'm Alone, No You're Not
 "White Flag", a song by September from Love CPR

Other uses
 White Flag (Johns painting), a painting by Jasper Johns
 White Flags, a rebel group in Iraq
 White Flag case , a Court case in Sri Lanka
 White Flag incident, a massacre in Sri Lanka
 Communist Party of Burma or white flags